Sergei Parajanov (January 9, 1924 – July 20, 1990) was an Armenian film director, screenwriter and artist 

Parajanov or the alternative transliteration Paradjanov may also refer to:

Parajanov: The Last Spring, a 1992 award-winning documentary by the Russian-Armenian filmmaker Mikhail Vartanov, that also includes the complete surviving footage of Sergei Parajanov's unfinished last film The Confession
Paradjanov (film), a 2013 Ukrainian biographical drama film directed by Serge Avedikian and Olena Fetisova, about film director Sergei Paradjanov

See also
Parajanov-Vartanov Institute, an American film organization based in Los Angeles, California, that works to study, preserve and promote the legacy of filmmakers Sergei Parajanov and Mikhail Vartanov